The STAR Management Week is the highlight of the year at RSM Erasmus University, as it is one of the largest student events in Benelux. This weeklong event is considered the annual pinnacle of STAR. Each autumn, over 100 multinationals, 600 students, and several guest speakers from around the globe participate in the STAR Management Week. The STAR Management Week was first organized in 1987, named Sviib Week. In 1996, the name changed to Sviib Management Week, changing to STAR Management Week in 2005.

The STAR Management consists of a wide array of activities, such as :

 Entrepreneurial Seminar
 Women's Conference
 Workshops
 Corporate Games
 Golf Clinic
 Sushi Workshop
 Company Dinner
 Company Visit
 Inhouse Day
 STAR Party

Academic Activities
The STAR Management Week always opened with the Academic Conference. The STAR Management Week 2013 will be the first edition without this conference. Instead, it will host a Women's Conference and the annual recurring Entrepreneurial Seminar. 

The Academic Conference was a distinguished academic event hosting several business and political leaders, who discussed global issues. Past speakers include:

2012 
 Jim Stolze - Host of the Day
 Herbert Hainer - CEO Adidas group
 Joost Conijn - Artist
 Kyle MacDonald - One Red Paperclip
 Joseph Oubelkas - Author of ‘400 brieven van mijn moeder’
 Samuel Aranda - Photographer, Winner of the ‘World Press Photo 2012’

2011 
 Hans Weijers - CEO Akzo Nobel)
 Jan Heemskerk - Editor-in-Chief at SMM/Playboy
 Rebecca Stephens - First British woman to climb Everest and the Seven Summits
 Eelco Hoekstra - Chairman of the Executive Board of Royal Vopak
 Christof H. Rühl - Group Chief Economist and Vice President of BP plc

2010 
 Baptiest Coopmans - Managing Director of Royal KPN NV and member of the Executive Board
 Dick Boer - CEO of Ahold Nederland NV and COO of Royal Ahold NV
 Pieter Jongstra - CEO of Ernst & Young
 Jan Pronk - Former Minister for Development Cooperation and former Minister of Environment
 Joop Munsterman - President of FC Twente and CEO of Royal Wegener NV
 Jan Närlinge - Vice President of Boeing International and President of Boeing Northern Europe
 Ulrich Bez - CEO of Aston Martin

2009 
 Chairman of the day: Lucy Hockings - Presenter of BBC World News
 Nick Hoek - CEO of Delta Lloyd Group
 Peter Bakker - CEO of TNT
 Reinhard Gorenflos - Senior Executive of Kohlberg Kravis Roberts & co.
 Erik Varwijk - Executive Vice President International and the Netherlands of Air France KLM
 Freek Vermeulen - Associate professor of Strategic & International Management London Business School
 Alex Brenninkmeijer - Ombudsman of the Netherlands
 Maxime Verhagen - Minister of Foreign Affairs

2008 
 Guusje ter Horst - Minister of the Interior and Kingdom Relations
 Jenny Shipley - Former Prime Minister of New-Zealand
 Chris Zook - Head of Global Strategy Practice Bain & Company
 Jan van Rutte - CEO of Fortis Bank Netherlands N.V.
 Paul Schnabel - Director of The Netherlands Institute for Social Research/SCP
 Chang - former CEO Philips Greater China
 René Paas - Chairman of the National Federation of Christian Trade Unions in the Netherlands
 Henk Volberda - Chairman of the Department of Strategic Management & Business Environment

2007 (Theme: Turn Good into Gold) 
 David Eades - presenter of BBC World
 Ibrahim Abouleish - Founder of Right Livelihood Award Laureate
 Wouter Bos - Dutch Deputy Prime Minister, Minister of Finance
 Antony Burgmans - Former CEO of Unilever
 Alexander Rinnooy Kan - Chairman of the Social and Economic Council of the Netherlands
 Jeffrey Sachs - Professor and Director of the Earth Institute at Columbia University
 Ben Verwaayen - CEO of British Telecom

2006 (Think Free, Act Different) 
 Todd Benjamin - Financial editor and anchorman for CNN
 Ruud Lubbers - Former Prime Minister of the Netherlands, Former United Nations High Commissioner for Refugees
 Gerrit Zalm - Deputy Prime Minister and Finance Minister of the Netherlands
 Hans-Paul Bürkner - President and CEO of The Boston Consulting Group
 Ad Scheepbouwer - CEO of KPN
 Agnes van Ardenne van der Hoeve - Minister for Development Cooperation of the Netherlands, Second and Third Balkenende cabinet
 Prof. dr. Rob de Wijk - Political Risk Expert from the Clingendael Institute
 Chris Zook - Director at Bain & Company

2005 (The Political Risks of Foreign Investments) 
 Charles Hodson - CNN Anchorman
 George Möller - CEO of Robeco
 Gordon Redding - INSEAD
 Guoyong Liang - UNCTAD
 Carlos Fortin - UNCTAD
 Mohammed Ibrahim - Founder and CEO of Celtel
 Jack Koolen - Managing Director Monitor Group South Africa
 Tayfun Bayazit - CEO Disbank
 Kaya Tuncer - President of ESBAS

Entrepreneurial Seminar 

The Entrepreneurial Seminar is the event where successful entrepreneurs share their experience with young students. Past speakers at the Entrepreneurial Seminar include:

2012 
 Menno Beker - Host of the Day and Serial Entrepreneur
 Batul Loomans - Founder Buddha to Buddha 
 Angelie Kaag & Cécile Wijdenes - Founders Lily’s Cupcakes 
 Henk Teunissen - CEO Rivièra Maison 
 Philip Hess - Co-founder Senz◦ umbrellas 
 Reinout Oerlemans - Founder Eyeworks

2011 
 Chairman of the day: Eva Jinek (Journalist, TV anchor)
John de Mol - Co-founder Endemol
 Reynier van Bommel - CEO Van Bommel B.V. 
 Jan van Kuijk - Co-founder Flow Traders
 Taco Carlier - Co-founder VANMOOF
 Ridder Drost - Founder Liquido d'Oro BV

2010 
 Chairman: Ben Tiggelaar (Author, researcher and speaker)
Marlies Dekkers - Founder Marlies Dekkers
 Harald van der Swinkels - Co-founder Nederlandse Energie Maatschappij
 Marc van der Chijs - Founder Tudou
 Igor Milder - Co-founder of INPACT
 Water Peteri - Co-founder of Quooker
 Bob Ultee - Founder of Sabon

2009 
 Chairman: Ben Tiggelaar (Author, researcher and speaker)
 Rob Heilbron - Founder of Sapph Lingerie and co-founder of O’Neill
 Jitse Groen - Founder of Thuisbezorgd.nl and Takeaway.com
 Jacob Gelt Dekker - Founder of One Hour Super Photo and Budget Rent a Car
 Boris Veldhuijzen van Zanten - Serial Internet Entrepreneur Founder of Redirect Services
 Duncan Stutterheim - Founder of ID&T, World’s biggest dance entrepreneur
 Kevin Eyres - Chief Executive Officer of LinkedIn Europe
 Mark Wegh - Emerging Entrepreneur 2008, Founder of Porsche Centrum Gelderland
 Thijs Boekhoff - Founder of Squarewise

2008 
 Chairman: Ben Tiggelaar (Author, researcher and speaker)
 Mario Moretti Polegato - Founder of Geox
 Dirk Scheringa - Founder of DSB Bank
 Henk Keilman - Founder of RIG Investments
 Richard Homburg - Founder of Homburg N.V.
 Annemarie van Gaal - Founder of AM Media
 Marc Cornelissen - Adventurer and Founder of Xmarx
 Bernhard van Oranje - Co-Founder Levi9 Global Sourcing

2007 
 Maarten de Bruijn - Co-founder Spyker Cars N.V. and Founder and CEO Silvestris
 Eric Meurice - President and CEO ASML Holding N.V.
 Clarissa Sarah Slingerland - Founder and CEO MissPublicity
 Justin Sanders - CEO Campina B.V.
 Coen van Oostrom - Founder and CEO OVG Project Development
 Alexander Ribbink - CEO TomTom N.V.
 Yvonne Swaans - Founder and CEO Direct Wonen N.V.

2006 
 Chairman: Pieter Witteveen (Founding partner and director OC&C Strategy Consultants Benelux)
 Frits Goldschmeding - Founder, Former President and Former CEO Randstad Holding N.V.
 Nancy McKinstry - CEO and Chairman of the Executive Board Wolter Kluwer N.V.
 Gary Mesch - Co-founder, Former CEO and Former Chairman Versatel Telecom International N.V.
 Marc van der Heijden - Co-founder, Former Chief Regulatory Officer Versatel Telecom International N.V.
Marlies Dekkers - Entrepreneur and Founder of Undressed
 Tierry Schaap - Founder and Chairman of the Management Board BicnkBank
 Peter Swinkels - CEO Bavaria N.V.
 René Frijters - Co-founder and Executive Director of Alex Beleggersbank

2005 
 Jorien van den Herik - Former chairman of Feyenoord
 Mario Moretti Polegato - Founder and Chairman of Geox
  - Founder of Centric Holding
 Michiel Muller - Co-founder of Route Mobiel
 Jan van Meerveld - Founder of Heliflight & Events
 Pieter Witteveen - (Founder of OC&C Benelux)

Women's Conference 

This Conference will showcase female professionals who will share their experiences and insights on how to fully realize women’s potential for professional development. Past speakers include:

2012 
 Jacqueline Zuidweg – CEO and Owner of Zuidweg & Partners B.V. 
 Joanne Kellermann – Director Nederlandsche Bank
 Willemijn Maas – CEO Avro
 Yolanda Eijgenstein – Founder Why Company?
 Lidwien Schils - Head Renewable Energy and Infrastructure Finance Rabobank International
 Mascha Driessen – Head of YouTube Benelux
 Melissa Raczak – Director Business Consulting Deloitte

References

Student events
Week-long events